The men's welterweight (−78 kilograms) taekwondo event at the 2006 Asian Games took place on 8 December 2006 at Qatar SC Indoor Hall, Doha, Qatar.

A total of sixteen competitors from sixteen countries competed in this event, limited to fighters whose body weight was less than 78 kilograms. 

Abdulqader Hikmat Sarhan of Qatar won his country's first ever Asian Games taekwondo gold medal after beating 1998 Asian Games gold medalist Mehdi Bibak of Iran in a controversial final 8–5. Bibak claimed he was cheated by the officials and he had so much more valid kicks than his Qatari opponent.

Liao Chia-hsing of Chinese Taipei and Deepak Bista from Nepal lost in semifinal and won the bronze medal.

Schedule
All times are Arabia Standard Time (UTC+03:00)

Results

References
Results

External links
Official website

Taekwondo at the 2006 Asian Games